Patras railway station is a railway station in Patras in the northwestern Peloponnese, Greece. The station is located in the center of the city, beside the north port on Piraeus–Patras line and Patras–Kyparissia line and is severed by both Proastiakos Patras Services. Pending the completion of the Athens Airport–Patras railway, it is also the starting point of TrainOSE bus lines to Aigio, Diakopto and Kiato, where connecting train services to Athens Airport and Piraeus (via Athens central railway station) are available. Diakopto is also the terminus of the unique rack railway to Kalavryta.

History
The station opened in 1954 as the main passenger terminal of the city (replacing the older Agios Dionysios as the closest station to the city centre) on the Kryoneri-Agrinio line, constructed in 1890. Originally located near the current hotel "Astir" Considerations for the construction of the station near the port of Patras had as early as 1901. A holt had opened for commercial use one due to its proximity to the port  with the construction in 1890 of the Kryoneri-Agrinio line, the station became the end of that line. The goods were transported to the city port to be unloaded on ships. as a result when the station opened in 1954 it became both the terminal of the line Piraeus-Patras and a starting point of the now defunct Patras-Kyparissia line.

In 1970 OSE became the legal successor to the SEK, taking over responsibilities for most of Greece's rail infrastructure. On 1 January 1971, the station and most of Greek rail infrastructure were transferred to the Hellenic Railways Organisation S.A., a state-owned corporation. Freight traffic declined sharply when the state-imposed monopoly of OSE for the transport of agricultural products and fertilisers ended in the early 1990s. Many small stations of the network with little passenger traffic were closed down. In 2005 operations from the station were suspended due to the reconstruction works of the OSE railway network in the region. In 2009, with the Greek debt crisis unfolding OSE's Management was forced to reduce services across the network. Timetables were cut back and routes closed as the government-run entity attempted to reduce overheads. The station reopened on 9 July 2010 as part of the Proastiakos Patras services, served by trains between Agios Andreas and Agios Vassilios stations. Since the suspension of regional services on the metre-gauge railways of the Peloponnese in 2011, the station is used only by local Proastiakos trains which currently connect the city with the suburbs of Rio and Kaminia. In 2017 OSE's passenger transport sector was privatised as TrainOSE, currently, a wholly owned subsidiary of Ferrovie dello Stato Italiane infrastructure, including stations, remained under the control of OSE. From 29 February 2020 service were suspended due to the coronavirus pandemic, becoming the starting point of the new Line 2 of the Suburban Railway to the town of Kato Achaia. With the resumption of services on 4 July 2020, it was replaced as the starting point of Line 2 by Agios Andreas.

The station also serves as the starting point of the TRAINOSE bus services that connects Patras with Aigio and Kiato via Diakoptos, where the starting point of Odontotos is located. The railway response takes place at these three stations with the Athens Suburban Railway. The trains of the latter run on the line Airport-Patras, the construction of which has been completed to Rododafni Achaia.

Facilities
The station lies in central Patras between Othonos-Amalias Avenue and the north port. It is a small concrete building, typical of the 1950s, without any modern facilities. Beside the station, there is a restaurant and a cafeteria. There is only a single platform and two  meter gauge rail tracks. After the completion of the new railway line the station will move to another more spacious building, but still, there are no publicly available data regarding the location and the architectural design of the new station.

Within a few meters distance from the station, there is the Patras Railway Museum open-air showroom which hosts a very old locomotive of the Piraeus, Athens and Peloponnese Railways (SPAP) No. Zs 7.532

Services
The station is served by the Agios Andreas–Rio line of the Proastiakos, with another line running from the Agios Andreas terminus to Kaminia pending the extension to Kato Achaia. Rail services are provided by OSE trains (Stadler GTW 2/6 diesel two-car units). The trains run every hour daily, from 6:23 in the morning until 23:23 in the evening. The Agios Andreas–Rio route has two bus connections at Kastellokampos—to Agios Vasileios and the General University Hospital of Patras via the University of Patras.

Several local bus lines of Patras pass through the station.

Gallery

References

External links
Οργανισμός Σιδηροδρόμων Ελλάδος (ΟΣΕ) - GTP

Buildings and structures in Patras
Railway stations in Achaea
Railway stations opened in 1954
1954 establishments in Greece
Transport in Patras